"What the Dead Men Say" is a science fiction novella by American writer Philip K. Dick, first published in Worlds of Tomorrow magazine in June 1964. The manuscript, originally titled "Man With a Broken Match", was received by Dick's agent on 15 April 1963.

Plot summary
Death is followed by a period of 'half-life', a short amount of time which can be rationed out over long periods in which the dead can be revived—so that, potentially, they can 'live' on for a long time. When attempts to bring back important businessman Louis Sarapis fail, it's clearly more than mere negligence. Sure enough, Sarapis starts speaking from beyond the grave. From outer space, in fact. Yet no-one seems terribly bothered, other than those directly concerned in the plot mechanics. Eventually entire communications networks (phones, TV, radio) are blocked by Sarapis' broadcasts.

The concept of 'half-life' was used again and developed in Dick's 1969 novel Ubik, which even re-uses a page of the novella verbatim.

References

External links
 
 

1964 short stories
Afterlife
Life extension
Short stories by Philip K. Dick
Works originally published in Worlds of Tomorrow (magazine)